Alidou Badini is a filmmaker from Burkina Faso who has worked on many films and TV productions. He co-directed the widely discussed Le Beurre et l'argent du beurre, which documents the realities of free trade.

Badini has been cameraman or assistant director on various films for the cinema and TV, starting with Keïta! l'Héritage du griot (1994) directed by Dani Kouyaté.
His short film Fleurs d'épines (Flowers of thorns) was nominated for a prize at the Panafrican Film and Television Festival of Ouagadougou in 2001.

Badini was co-director of Le Beurre et l'argent du beurre, which explores the trade in shea butter made from the nuts of the shea tree, a source of cash to subsistence farmers in Burkina Faso. The almonds and the butter extracted from the nuts are used in cooking and body care.
Although attempts have been made to apply "fair trade" principles, the film questions whether the villagers can in practice escape the implacable force of the market.
Le Beurre et l'argent du beurre was shown at the Amiens International Film Festival.
The film received the Jury Grand Prize at the International Environmental Film Festival of Niamey.
It has been used as the basis for discussions by groups who support fair trade.

Filmography

References

Living people
Burkinabé film directors
Year of birth missing (living people)
21st-century Burkinabé people